Whipple Van Ness "Whip" Jones (November 8, 1909 – June 29, 2001) was a ski industry pioneer, founder, developer and the original operator for 35 years, of the Aspen Highlands ski area in Aspen, Colorado. Whip Jones and the company he founded, Aspen Highlands, won a US Supreme Court case against his rival, the Aspen Skiing Company. Jones was also a philanthropist, and was inducted into The Colorado Ski Hall of Fame and The Aspen Hall of Fame for his work with Aspen Highlands.

Early years
Jones was born in Oconomowoc, Wisconsin to Esther Olin Whipple (1884–1977) and Frank William Jones I (1876–1936). A 1932 graduate of Harvard University, he married heiress Mary Sue McCulloch (1913–1996). He was a captain in the Missouri State Guard and worked as a trust officer at the St. Louis Union Trust Company. At the outbreak of World War II he transferred to the US Army Air Corps and rose to the rank of lieutenant colonel.

Founder of Aspen Highlands 
Jones was the builder and the owner of the Aspen Highlands, one of the four ski areas of Aspen, Colorado.

Aspen Highlands had its beginning in 1956. Jones owned the land at the base of the mountain and became interested in developing it after the Forest Service suggested it would be a "great place for a ski area." Jones first offered the opportunity to Aspen Skiing Company who turned it down. He then hired Dick Durrance to do a feasibility study and Fritz Benedict to design a lodge. Jones went ahead with the project on his own, and laid out a well-balanced set of ski runs: 25% beginner, 50% intermediate, 25% advanced. Jones financed the project by selling the lumber from the cleared ski runs and using low cost labor. When the area opened in 1958 it had three lifts, including the world's longest single section double chairlift and eventually grew to over 50 trails. The base area of Highlands Mountain is located 1½ miles from the village of Aspen.

Supreme Court antitrust case 

Throughout his ownership, Aspen Highlands and founder Jones remained at odds with the local rival Aspen Skiing Company, which owned and operated the three other ski areas Aspen Mountain (Ajax), Buttermilk and Snowmass in Aspen, with Jones owning the remaining independent ski area, Aspen Highlands. In 1979, Jones sued the Aspen Skiing Company, alleging violations of the Sherman Act. Aspen Highlands and Aspen Skiing had, for several years, cooperated to sell an "all-Aspen" ticket that allowed a skier to visit Aspen Skiing's three mountains and Aspen Highlands. However, the rival companies were unable to agree on a means to administer this program and distribute proceeds. In 1978, Aspen Skiing decided to discontinue the all-Aspen ticket, and to instead sell only the ticket to the three Aspen Skiing mountains. Aspen Skiing also refused to sell Aspen Highlands any lift tickets to the Aspen Skiing mountains (even at full price), thereby preventing Aspen Highlands from offering its own multi-mountain package.

Halls of Fame 
In 1998, Jones was inducted into the Aspen Hall of Fame and in 2000, he was inducted into the Colorado Ski Hall of Fame. At the induction ceremony, the Colorado Hall of Fame noted: 
Whip's vision and marketing ingenuity proved invaluable when he had to compete with the larger Aspen Ski Corporation... His innovative marketing lured many a skier to the Highlands with the promise of fun. Many Coloradans remember with nostalgia the wine and cheese parties, Stein Erickson's flips on skis, and the opening of Steeplechase near the top of Loge Peak--a steep, avalanche-prone slope that gave expert skiers a taste of adventure.

Death
He died on June 29, 2001 in Tallahassee, Florida after a long illness.

Harvard endowment
In 1992, after the longest continuous ownership of any ski area in Colorado, Jones donated the Highlands to Harvard University.  The $18.3 million gift remains one of the largest donations the University has ever received. The proceeds endow the "Whipple V.N. Jones Cornerstone Scholarship Fund" and the "Whipple V.N. Jones Professor of Economics Chair" once held by Andrei Shleifer and currently held by Xiao-Li Meng.

See also
 Aspen Highlands
 Aspen Skiing Company

References

External links 
New York Times funeral notice
Supreme Court case
 Colorado Ski and Snowboard Hall of Fame biography
 Colorado Ski Museum biography
 Aspen Historical Society
 Whipple Family Association

1909 births
2001 deaths
People from Oconomowoc, Wisconsin
Businesspeople from St. Louis
Harvard University alumni
American chief executives
American sports businesspeople
American sports executives and administrators
People from Aspen, Colorado
Aspen Skiing Company
20th-century American businesspeople